The 2015 Copa América was the 44th edition of the Copa América, the main international football tournament for national teams in South America, and took place in Chile between 11 June and 4 July 2015. The competition was organized by CONMEBOL, South America's football governing body.

Twelve teams competed: the ten members of CONMEBOL and two guests from CONCACAF – Mexico and Jamaica, the latter of which competed in the Copa América for the first time.

Uruguay were the defending champions, but were eliminated by the host nation Chile in the quarter-finals. Chile won their first title, defeating Argentina in the final on penalties after a goalless draw. As winners, they qualified for the 2017 FIFA Confederations Cup in Russia.

Host country 
Originally, it was to be hosted by Brazil, as suggested by the Brazilian Football Confederation (CBF) in February 2011 due to CONMEBOL's rotation policy of tournaments being held in alphabetical order. However, due to the organization of the 2013 FIFA Confederations Cup, 2014 FIFA World Cup and the 2016 Summer Olympics in that country, Brazil decided against also hosting the Copa América. CONMEBOL's president Nicolas Leoz had mentioned the possibility of the tournament being organized in Mexico (despite this country not being a member of CONMEBOL) as part of the federation's centenary celebrations. Brazil and Chile's Football Federations discussed the idea of swapping around the order of being hosts of the 2015 and 2019 tournaments. The swap was made official in May 2012.

Venues 
There were nine different stadiums in eight cities used for the tournament. Most stadiums were renovated or rebuilt for the contest.

Teams 

Mexico and Japan were initially invited to join the 10 CONMEBOL nations in the tournament. Japan declined the invitation, and China was invited instead, but later withdrew due to the Asian sector of qualification for the 2018 World Cup being held at the same time. In May 2014, it was announced that the Jamaica Football Federation had accepted an invitation to participate, thus making Jamaica the first Caribbean nation to compete in Copa America.

Draw 
The draw of the tournament was originally to be held on 27 October 2014 in Viña del Mar, but was postponed to 24 November. The 12 teams were drawn into three groups of four.

CONMEBOL announced the composition of the four pots on 10 November 2014. Pot 1 contained the hosts Chile (which has been automatically assigned to position A1), together with Argentina and Brazil. The remaining nine teams were allocated to the other three pots according to their FIFA World Rankings as of 23 October 2014 (shown in brackets), even though Colombia was rated higher than Brazil. On 23 November 2014, it was announced by CONMEBOL that Argentina and Brazil had been assigned to positions B1 and C1, respectively.

Squads 

Each country had a final squad of 23 players (three of whom had to be goalkeepers) which had to be submitted before the deadline of 1 June 2015.

The 2015 UEFA Champions League Final date of 6 June caused problems for South American players for Barcelona and Juventus. FIFA international rules require clubs to release players 14 days prior to the start of an international tournament, but the players featured in the final, leaving them at most five days to acclimate. For example, Arturo Vidal arrived two days before Chile's first match against Ecuador, and played with little training with his national team.

Mexico manager Miguel Herrera decided to prioritize the upcoming 2015 CONCACAF Gold Cup, saying, "We have to win at all costs in order to face the United States in the playoffs that guarantee a spot in the 2017 Confederations Cup." The Mexican squad was a team composed mostly from the local league with little international experience.

Uruguayan forward Luis Suárez was suspended for the whole tournament, as he served a nine-match ban in international football for biting Italian defender Giorgio Chiellini during Uruguay's final group stage match against Italy in the 2014 FIFA World Cup.

Match officials 
Source:

Group stage 
The fixture schedule was announced on 11 November 2014.

The first round, or group stage, saw the twelve teams divided into three groups of four teams. Each group was a round-robin of six games, where each team played one match against each of the other teams in the same group. Teams were awarded three points for a win, one point for a draw and none for a defeat. The teams finishing first, second and two best-placed third teams in each group qualified for the quarter-finals.

Tie-breaking criteria
Teams were ranked on the following criteria:
Greater number of points in all group matches
Goal difference in all group matches
Greater number of goals scored in all group matches
Head-to-head result (between two teams only)
Penalty shoot-out (if both teams are playing the last match of the group stage)
Drawing of lots by the CONMEBOL Organizing Committee

All times local, CLT (UTC−3).

Group A

Group B

Group C

Ranking of third placed teams

Knockout stage

Quarter-finals

Semi-finals

Third place playoff

Final

Statistics

Goalscorers 
Chile's Eduardo Vargas and Peru's Paolo Guerrero scored the most goals, with 4 each. In total, 59 goals were scored by 39 different players, with two of them credited as own goals.

4 goals

  Eduardo Vargas
  Paolo Guerrero

3 goals

  Sergio Agüero
  Arturo Vidal
  Lucas Barrios

2 goals

  Ángel Di María
  Gonzalo Higuaín
  Marcelo Moreno
  Charles Aránguiz
  Miller Bolaños
  Enner Valencia
  Raúl Jiménez
  Matías Vuoso

1 goal

  Lionel Messi
  Javier Pastore
  Marcos Rojo
  Ronald Raldes
  Martin Smedberg-Dalence
  Douglas Costa
  Neymar
  Roberto Firmino
  Robinho
  Thiago Silva
  Mauricio Isla
  Gary Medel
  Alexis Sánchez
  Jeison Murillo
  Édgar Benítez
  Derlis González
  Nelson Valdez
  André Carrillo
  Christian Cueva
  Claudio Pizarro
  José Giménez
  Cristian Rodríguez
  Miku
  Salomón Rondón

Own goals
  Ronald Raldes (against Chile)
  Gary Medel (against Peru)

Assists 
3 assists
  Lionel Messi
  Jorge Valdivia

2 assists
  Ángel Di María
  Dani Alves
  Adrián Aldrete

Winners

Awards 
The following awards were given at the conclusion of the tournament.
 Golden Ball Award: This was the first time of Copa America's history "Golden Ball Award" cancelled.  Lionel Messi rejected it but Argentina's stuff was to receive the award.
 Golden Boot Award:  Eduardo Vargas and  Paolo Guerrero (4 goals each)
 Best Young Player Award:  Jeison Murillo
 Golden Glove Award:  Claudio Bravo
 Fair Play Award:

Final Man of the Match Award 
  Arturo Vidal

Team of the Tournament

Marketing

Sponsorship 
Banco Santander
MasterCard
Kia Motors
America Móvil (Claro Americas and Telcel)
The Coca-Cola Company
Kellogg's (Pringles)
DHL
LAN-TAM
Canon
Airbnb
Opta Sports
Aggreko
Arena sport TV

Logo and slogan
On 2 April 2014, the official logo was unveiled, along with the slogan "El Corazón del Fútbol" ("The Heart of Football").

Match ball 
On 16 November 2014, the official match ball (OMB) was unveiled at the Estadio Nacional. The name of the ball is Nike Cachaña, which is a Chilean slang term for a successful feint or dribble. During its launch, the Chilean international Arturo Vidal was present. The ball is mainly designed with white as main appearance featured with blue and red applications, representing host nation Chile. The colors of Chilean flag make a statement in the design of this ball: the red representing the people, the blue symbolizing the Chilean sky, and the white for the Andes that so strongly define the geography of this country.

Mascot 
The official mascot of the tournament, a young culpeo fox, was unveiled on 17 November 2014. The name of the mascot, "Zincha" (from Zorro (fox) and hINCHA (fan)), was chosen by the public over two other options, "Andi" and "Kul".

Official song 
"Al Sur del Mundo" by Chilean group Noche de Brujas served as the official song of the tournament. It was performed during the opening ceremony of the competition on 11 June. It features the different cultures of the twelve competing nations.

Incidents and controversies 
The day after Chile's 3–3 draw against Mexico in their second group match, Jorge Sampaoli gave the players a day off from training. They had to return to the training ground by 9pm, but Arturo Vidal did not arrive. He had been involved in a traffic accident on his way back to the ground, and arrested for driving under the influence. He spent the night in jail, and appeared in court the morning after. His driving license was revoked, and he was sentenced to pay for the damage done. Although there was speculation that he would be dropped, Sampaoli opted to keep him on the team.

An on-pitch brawl broke out following Colombia's 1–0 win over Brazil in their second group match; Brazilian captain Neymar deliberately kicked the ball at opponent Pablo Armero and attempted to headbutt Colombian matchwinner Jeison Murillo, earning a red card. As a result, Colombian forward Carlos Bacca retaliated by pushing Neymar over, and was himself sent off. CONMEBOL fined Neymar $10,000 and suspended him for four matches, ruling him out for the remainder of the tournament, while Bacca was suspended for two matches.

In Chile's quarter-final victory over Uruguay, full-back Gonzalo Jara poked Uruguayan forward Edinson Cavani in the anus, and then fell when Cavani slapped him in retaliation. Both Cavani and Jara received a yellow card for the incident, which resulted in Cavani being sent off because he had previously received another yellow card for insulting one of the referees' assistants. Jara was later suspended for two games, which made him miss the rest of the tournament. His club, Mainz 05 of Germany, criticized Jara for the incident and stated that he would be sold. However he would remain with the club until 16 January 2016 when he agreed to terminate his contract with them.

References

External links 

 (Official website) 
Copa América 2015, CONMEBOL.com 

 
2014–15 in Chilean football
2015 in South American football
2015
2015
June 2015 sports events in South America
July 2015 sports events in South America
Sports competitions in Santiago
2010s in Santiago, Chile
Sport in Antofagasta Region
La Serena, Chile
Sport in Valparaíso Region
Rancagua
Concepción, Chile
Temuco